Bear Creek High School is located in the southwest corner of Lakewood, Colorado, a suburb of the greater Denver metro area. It is one of 18 high schools in Jefferson County.

The school colors are forest green, gold, and white. The mascot is a bear. The principal is Alison Shanor. There are 1,634 students as of October 2018, along with 87 full-time teachers.  It is a Class 4A Athletic Program and has over 34 clubs and activities.

History
Bear Creek High School was established in 1894 as the Montana School.  The school was a single room that served elementary grades one through eight. It was not until 1920 that the neighboring community decided to consolidate, thus giving the region its first high school. Before the school was built, all students planning to continue their education either had to live in or commute to schools in Denver.

The Bear Creek Consolidated school combined five elementary school school districts. The four other schools were Montana School, Lakeview, Midway and Mount Carbon.

The first class in 1923 consisted of five graduates. From this point on, the school was known as the Bear Creek Consolidated School.

By 1950, all of the schools in Jefferson County had been consolidated and became the Jefferson County School District R-1.

The class of 1952 became the first to graduate in the newly named Bear Creek High School.

Although a fire in 1959 destroyed the original structure, classes were still held in the gymnasium. The new building was built just east of where the current school stands. This building stood for nearly 57 years until a new building, completed in 2009, was built where the original Consolidated School once stood.

On April 22, 2008, during the construction of the new building, Bear Creek High School students experienced another major fire that damaged a gymnasium and several classrooms. After further investigation, it was determined that the fire was an act of arson by two unnamed Bear Creek students. The cause of the fire was an discarded cigarette which caught an exercise mat on fire. This was the second fire within a year at a Jefferson County school. On June 1 at Weber Elementary School a fire that was determined to also be arson, caused nearly $65 million in total damages.

Notable alumni

 Dennis Rasmussen, former MLB player (San Diego Padres, New York Yankees, Cincinnati Reds, Chicago Cubs, Kansas City Royals)
 Marc Schiechl, NFL player (Jacksonville Jaguars)
 Jeremiah Sirles, NFL player
Bisi Johnson, NFL player (Minnesota Vikings)
Carey Lowell, actress
Julie McCluskie, Member of the Colorado House of Representatives, and Speaker of the House (January, 2023)

References

External links
 

Educational institutions established in 1920
Public high schools in Colorado
Jefferson County Public Schools (Colorado)
Education in Lakewood, Colorado
Schools in Jefferson County, Colorado
1920 establishments in Colorado